Fisk is an Australian television comedy series on ABC Television, first airing on 17 March 2021.

Plot summary
The series revolves around the life of lawyer Helen Tudor-Fisk, who leaves Sydney for Melbourne after her career and marriage fall apart.

Cast
 Kitty Flanagan as Helen Tudor-Fisk
 Marty Sheargold as Ray Gruber
 Julia Zemiro as Roz Gruber
 Aaron Chen as George
 Debra Lawrance as May
 George Henare as Graham
 John Gaden as Anthony Fisk
 Glenn Butcher as Viktor
 Bert La Bonté as William
 Colette Mann as Mrs Popovitch

Production
The first series includes many guest stars in cameo roles. These include Glenn Robbins (as the penis painter - episode 1), Marg Downey, Ed Kavalee, Glenn Ridge (emcee - episode 6), Sam Pang, Colette Mann and Dave O'Neil.

Filming took place in North Melbourne and other locations during the global pandemic, with strict protocols on room density and proximity. Large groupings had to be avoided.

In November, 2021 it was announced that a second series had been commissioned by the ABC. It was released in 2022. Filming took place in the same locations, and Dean Glenn Robbins and others made guest appearances.

Episodes

Series 1

Series 2

Release and reception
The first series went to air on ABC TV from 17 March 2021.

Viewership

Critical reception
Kylie Northover of the Sydney Morning Herald gave the series debut 3.5 of 4 stars. Luke Buckmaster, writing in The Guardian, gave the show 3/5 stars, opining that the first episode was funnier than the rest. 

In September 2021 Fisk won the Best Series Award in the comedies competition at Europe's largest TV festival, Series Mania, in Lille, France, beating six other series chosen for the event, including the multi-Emmy-nominated series Hacks, from HBO.

Awards and nominations

|-
|rowspan="2"|2022
|rowspan="2"|Logie Awards of 2022
|Most Popular Actress
|Kitty Flanagan
|
|rowspan="2"|
|-
|Most Popular Comedy Program
|Fisk
|

References

External links

Fisk — ABC iView

Australian Broadcasting Corporation original programming
Australian comedy television series
2021 Australian television series debuts
Television shows set in Melbourne
English-language television shows